José María Martínez may refer to:

 José María Martínez (canoeist) (born 1968), Spanish slalom canoer
 José María Martínez (footballer) (born 1947), Argentine former footballer

See also 
 Jose Martinez (disambiguation)